Tamrat, also Tamirat  is a male given name of Ethiopian origin that may refer to:

Tamirat Layne (born 1955), Ethiopian politician and former leader of the Ethiopian People's Democratic Movement
Tamrat Molla (1945–2012), Ethiopian singer and vocalist
Taddesse Tamrat (1935–2013), Ethiopian history professor of Medieval Ethiopia

Ethiopian given names
Amharic-language names